Jordans may refer to:

Communities
 Jordans, Buckinghamshire, a village in England
 Friendship, Wake County, North Carolina, an unincorporated community formerly known as Jordans
 Pipestem, West Virginia, an unincorporated community in Summers County also known as Jordans Chapel

Other uses
 Air Jordan, a brand of Nike shoes sponsored by American basketball player Michael Jordan
 Jordans' anomaly, a familial abnormality of white blood cell morphology
 Jordans Mine, on the Isle of Portland in Dorset, England
 Jordanshöhe, a mountain in central Germany

See also 
 
 Jordan (disambiguation)